Offering is a jazz album by guitarist Larry Coryell that was released by Vanguard Records in 1972. Coryell's sidemen were Steve Marcus on soprano sax, Mervin Bronson on bass, Mike Mandel on electric piano, and Harry Wilkinson on drums. The album was produced by Daniel Weiss and engineered by Jeff Zaraya.

Track listing
All tracks written by Larry Coryell, except where noted

Side one
 "Foreplay" – 8:11
 "Ruminations" (Doug Davis) – 4:17
 "Scotland I" – 6:26

Side two
 "Offering" (Harry C. Wilkinson) – 6:37
 "The Mediation of November 8th" – 5:12
 "Beggar's Chant"(Davis) – 8:07

Personnel

Musicians
 Larry Coryell – guitar
 Steve Marcus – soprano sax
 Mike Mandel – electric piano with fuzz-wah
 Mervin Bronson – bass
 Harry Wilkinson – drums

Production
 Jeff Zaraya – engineering
 Daniel Weiss – producer
 Jules Halfant – art direction
 France Ing – cover photo
 John Jonas Gruen – back cover photo

Chart performance

References

External links
 

1972 albums
Larry Coryell albums
Vanguard Records albums